Charles Dryden (1860–1931) was an American baseball writer and humorist.

Charles Dryden may also refer to:

Charles Dryden (English writer) (1666–1704), son of English poet John Dryden, chamberlain to Pope Innocent XII
Charles Dryden (Tuskegee Airman) (1920–2008), U.S. Army Air Corps airman
Charles Dryden (cricketer) (1860–1943), New Zealand cricketer